This is a recap of the 2001–02 season for the Professional Bowlers Association (PBA) tour.  It was the tour's 43rd season. This was a transitional season for the PBA Tour following its sale in April 2000. After holding nine events in the early part of 2001, the PBA announced it was moving to a "seasonal" (September–March) National Tour format. The first event under this new format would have been the Wichita Open on September 13th, but it was cancelled due to the September 11th attacks. An additional 21 events were held in this time frame, for a total of 30 events in 2001–02.

Parker Bohn III won his second PBA Player of the Year award in three seasons, after posting five titles on the season. The season featured two PBA World Championship events. The first, in 2001, was won by Walter Ray Williams, Jr. The second, in 2002, offered an unprecedented $120,000 first prize and was won by Doug Kent. There were also two ABC Masters events, one in each calendar year.  Parker Bohn III won the 2001 event, while amateur Brett Wolfe won the 2002 event.

The season's other major, the U.S. Open was won by Mika Koivuniemi.

With his win in the Silicon Valley Open, Mike Aulby became the only bowler in history to win at least one standard PBA Tour title in four different decades.

Tournament schedule

References

External links
2001–02 Season Schedule

Professional Bowlers Association seasons
2001 in bowling
2002 in bowling